Princess Luise Dorothea Sophie of Prussia (29 September 1680 – 23 December 1705) was Hereditary Princess of Hesse-Kassel by marriage to Frederick, Hereditary Prince of Hesse-Kassel. She was the daughter of Frederick I, the first king in Prussia, by his first wife Elisabeth Henriette of Hesse-Kassel. She died in childbirth.

Biography

On 31 May 1700, she married her first cousin Frederick, Hereditary Prince of Hesse-Kassel. Frederick was King of Sweden 1720-1751 and Landgrave of Hesse-Kassel from 1730 to 1751.

Luise Dorothea was married in Berlin 31 May 1700 in a grand ceremony which took place during several weeks to great costs. Conrad Mel wrote Font Legatio orientalis at the occasion. During her five years of marriage, Luise Dorothea suffered from poor health. She died in childbirth.

Frederick remarried to Princess Ulrika Eleonora of Sweden, later becoming her prince consort and eventual King of Sweden.

Ancestry

1680 births
1705 deaths
Deaths in childbirth
House of Hohenzollern
Prussian princesses
House of Hesse-Kassel
People from Berlin
Hereditary Princesses of Hesse-Kassel
Daughters of kings